The Men's 1000 metres competition at the 2017 World Single Distances Speed Skating Championships was held on 11 February 2017.

Results
The race was started at 18:45.

References

Men's 1000 metres